General elections were held in Kuwait on 25 January 1967. Pro-government candidates remained the largest bloc in Parliament. Voter turnout was 65.6%.

Results

References

Kuwait
Election
Elections in Kuwait
Non-partisan elections